Gayaza is a town in Wakiso District in the Buganda Region of Uganda.

Location
Gayaza is in the North Kyaddondo Constituency, Kyaddondo County. The coordinates of Gayaza are 0°27'03.0"N, 32°36'42.0"E (Latitude:0.450833; Longitude:32.611667).

Overview
In the early 20th century, Gayaza started as a road junction, where the road to Gayaza High School branched off the main road from Kampala to Kalagi. Shops began to appear in the middle of the century when the Uganda Ministry of Agriculture opened an agricultural research center at Namulonge. Later, Makerere University opened a crop and animal farm at Kabanyolo to cater for the faculties of Agriculture and Veterinary Medicine. Today, the township continues to grow and is continuous with Kasangati, a short distance to the south-east.

Points of interest
The following points of interest lie within Gayaza township or close to its borders: (a) Gayaza High School, an all-girls' boarding middle and high school established in 1905. (b) the Gayaza–Ziroobwe Road, a  road that connects Gayaza to Ziroobwe in Luweero District (c) National Crops Resources Research Institute (NACRRI) at Namulonge, an agricultural research institute belonging to the Ugandan government.

Other points of interest include (d)  Makerere University Agricultural Research institute, Kabanyolo, an animal and crop farm and research institute, shred between the Colleges of Agriculture and Veterinary Medicine of Makerere University. (f) Gayaza Fresh Produce Market

Also is the neighborhood are (g) Kampala Ice Motel, an international-standard, Holiday Inn-like motel established in 2013.

References

External links
Rising Crime Rates In Kampala Suburbs

Wakiso District
Populated places in Central Region, Uganda
Cities in the Great Rift Valley